Pavlovskoye is a rural locality (a selo) and the administrative center of Pavlovskoye Rural Settlement, Suzdalsky District, Vladimir Oblast, Russia. The population was 1,412 as of 2010. There are 21 streets.

Geography 
Pavlovskoye is located 17 km north from Vladimir, 11 km south of Suzdal (the district's administrative centre) by road. Semyonovskoye-Krasnoye is the nearest rural locality.

References 

Rural localities in Suzdalsky District
Suzdalsky Uyezd